M50 motorway may refer to:
M50 motorway (Ireland), a major road in Dublin
M50 motorway (Great Britain), a road in the United Kingdom

See also
M-50 (Spain), Madrid third outer ring road
M-50 (Michigan highway), a road in the United States of America